RTMP  may refer to:

 Real-Time Messaging Protocol, a multimedia streaming and remote procedure call protocol primarily used in Adobe Flash
 Routing Table Maintenance Protocol, part of the AppleTalk network stack
 Royal Tyrrell Museum of Palaeontology

See also
 RTP (disambiguation)